HMS Tracker  is an  (P2000) patrol and training vessel of the British Royal Navy. Along with the batch 2 Archer class, Tracker is part of the Faslane Patrol Boat Squadron based at HMNB Clyde.

Characteristics
Tracker is one of sixteen 20-metre, 54-tonne P2000 patrol craft operated by the Royal Navy. She is constructed from glass-reinforced plastic.  As a "batch 2" vessel, Tracker has a sustainable top speed of 24 knots, faster than her batch 1 sister ships due to her more powerful turbocharged MTU diesels; she can exceed 24 knots in suitable sea conditions.  Both Raider and Tracker operate in the force protection role, providing maritime security for high value shipping in the Firth of Clyde, and are armed with three general purpose machine guns.

Details
Tracker commissioned alongside her sister  in January 1998, with Tracker replacing Oxford University Royal Naval Unit's previous training craft, Loyal Chancellor. She served with Oxford University Royal Naval Unit for sea-based training of both students and regular personnel in UK and European waters.  In October 2012 both Tracker and Raider joined the Faslane Patrol Boat Squadron.

References

External links

 

Archer-class patrol vessels
1998 ships